Expo 2020 was a World Expo hosted by Dubai in the United Arab Emirates from 1 October 2021 to 31 March 2022. There are 200 pavilions in Expo 2020 Dubai, out of which 191 are representatives of participating countries. The following nations and organizations are participating in Expo 2020:

List of countries' pavilions

References

External links
 
 
 Virtual online Expo 2020

Expo 2020